Least willow is a common name for several plants and may refer to:

Salix herbacea